Thornleigh railway station is located on the Main Northern line, serving the Sydney suburb of Thornleigh. It is served by Sydney Trains T9 Northern Line services.

History
Thornleigh station opened on 17 September 1886. Platform 1 is located on a loop and does not have any booked passenger workings, while south of the station, the line has a loop on each side as far as Pennant Hills.

To the north of the station, a line previously branched off to a quarry.

The local control panel was closed on 12 November 2006, with control transferred to Strathfield Signal Box. Control of Thornleigh was again transferred to the new Homebush Signal Box in October 2008.

Train services running through to the city through the Epping-Chatswood Rail Link via Macquarie University and Chatswood ceased on 30 September 2018. The track closure was due to the planned introduction of the Metro North West Line which opened 26 May 2019. Replacement buses, known as Station Link buses were offered from Epping and during peak hours from Beecroft station to access the stations between Epping and Chatswood, via Maquarie University.

Platforms and services

Transport links
Hillsbus operates one route via Thornleigh station:
600: Hornsby station to Parramatta station

Transdev NSW operates two routes via Thornleigh station:
586: to Westleigh to Pennant Hills station
589: Hornsby station to Sydney Adventist Hospital

Thornleigh station is served by one NightRide route:
N80: Hornsby station to Town Hall station

Trackplan

Facilities 
Thornleigh station has a multi-level car park that has disabled parking access, adjacent from platform 3 giving disabled access to that platform. Upgrades to the station are currently under planning for all platforms (1 & 2 included) to be accessible via elevator. Other amenities are under planning for upgrade such as family accessible restrooms and pathways, as well as replacing the tiling and repainting.

Thornleigh station has restrooms located between platforms 1 & 2.

There are two vendors where you can add more value to an opal card. One between platform 1 and 2: an opal card machine where existing opal cards can be "topped up" using cash or card, or to purchase temporary "single trip" cards, there is another place at Thornleigh station to top up an opal card, that is on platform 3, facing the esplanade, with a small newsagent. Many items are available for purchase, such as newspapers, drinks and snacks.

References

External links

Thornleigh station details Transport for New South Wales

Railway stations in Sydney
Railway stations in Australia opened in 1886
Main North railway line, New South Wales